Fervor EP is a 1983 EP by Jason & the Scorchers. Originally released by Praxis, it was expanded and rereleased by EMI the following year.

Production
Ringenberg convinced the band to record Bob Dylan's "Absolutely Sweet Marie" after claiming that he was the author of the song.

Critical reception
The Guardian wrote that the EP was "cleaner and better" than the debut, calling the Dylan cover "a staggeringly exciting version."

Track listing
 "Absolutely Sweet Marie" (Bob Dylan) – 3:09
 "Help There's a Fire" (Jason Ringenberg) – 2:26
 "I Can't Help Myself" (Tim Krekel) – 2:51
 "Hot Nights in Georgia" (Jeff Johnson, Ringenberg) – 2:28
 "Pray For Me, Mama (I'm A Gypsy Now)" (Johnson, Ringenberg) – 3:49
 "Harvest Moon" (Ringenberg) – 3:19
 "Both Sides of the Line" (Ringenberg, Michael Stipe) – 3:47

Personnel 
Jason Ringenberg - guitar, harmonica, vocals
Perry Baggs – drums, vocals
Warner Hodges – electric guitar, steel guitar, vocals
Jeff Johnson – guitar, bass
Michael Stipe - harmony vocals on "Hot Nights in Georgia"
Technical
Terry Manning – producer, engineer
Charlie Ainley - engineer
Richard Rosebrough – engineer 
Jack Emerson - executive producer

References

1983 EPs
Jason & the Scorchers EPs
Albums produced by Jim Dickinson